Abdus Sattar Bhuiyan (born 16 January 1939) is a Bangladesh Nationalist Party politician and the incumbent Jatiya Sangsad member representing the Brahmanbaria-2 constituency. He resigned from the latest position on 11 December 2022 but re-elected for the same position as an independent candidate in the follow up by-election on 8 February 2023.

Early life and family
Bhuiyan was born on 16 January 1939 to a Bengali Muslim family of Bhuiyans in Paramanandapur Boro Bari, Sarail, then located in the Brahmanbaria subdivision of the Tippera District. His parents were Maqsud Ali Bhuiyan and Rahima Khatun.

Career
Bhuiyan served as the State Minister of Land  and the State Minister of Power in the Second Khaleda Cabinet of Bangladesh Nationalist Party. He also served as the State Minister for Fisheries and Livestock in the Second Khaleda cabinet.

Bhuiyan served as an adviser of Khaleda Zia as well. He was re-elected to the parliament in the by-election 2023 as an independent candidate.

References

1939 births
Living people
Bangladesh Nationalist Party politicians
State Ministers of Fisheries and Livestock
State Ministers of Land
State Ministers of Power, Energy and Mineral Resources
2nd Jatiya Sangsad members
6th Jatiya Sangsad members
7th Jatiya Sangsad members
11th Jatiya Sangsad members
People from Sarail Upazila